Purga may refer to several places:
 Purga, Estonia
 Purga, Queensland
 Purga, Slovenia
 The Siberian subtype of the Buran wind of the Asian interior
 Purga-class icebreaker, type of ship operated by the Russian Coast Guard